425 Fifth Avenue is a  residential skyscraper at 38th Street and Fifth Avenue in Midtown Manhattan, New York City. It was developed by RFR Davis and designed by Michael Graves. It has 55 floors and 197 units. The building uses air rights from two small adjoining buildings and a zoning bonus for providing a public plaza to maximize its floor area. , it is the 96th-tallest building in New York City. 

The building's site was originally home to a 5-story structure known as the Siebrecht Building which was home to Pierre Abraham Lorillard. Construction started in late 1999. The original architect of the project was Robert A. M. Stern, who was replaced by Michael Graves in 2001. The building topped-out in April 2002, and was opened that September.

See also
List of tallest buildings in New York City

References

External links
Emporis
Skyscraperpage

Residential skyscrapers in Manhattan
Residential buildings completed in 2003
Fifth Avenue
Midtown Manhattan
Michael Graves buildings
New Classical architecture
2003 establishments in New York City